Helen Jane Grandon (née Morgan; 20 July 1966 – 19 November 2020) was a field hockey player, who was a member of the British squad that won the bronze medal at the 1992 Summer Olympics in Barcelona.

She was educated at Porthcawl Comprehensive School, and joined Swansea hockey club at the age of thirteen.

Later in her career, she played for and captained the Wales international football team.

References

External links
 
 

Welsh female field hockey players
Field hockey players at the 1992 Summer Olympics
Olympic field hockey players of Great Britain
British female field hockey players
Female field hockey goalkeepers
Olympic bronze medallists for Great Britain
1966 births
2020 deaths
People from Porthcawl
Sportspeople from Bridgend County Borough
Olympic medalists in field hockey
Welsh Olympic medallists
Medalists at the 1992 Summer Olympics